Çarşamba Sports Hall is a multi-purpose indoor sport venue located in Çarşamba district of Samsun Province, northern Turkey.

The venue is situated at Çarşamba Sugar Refinery, Beyyenice, Çarşamba. It has a seating capacity for 2,000 spectators, including 100 for VIP, 100 for media members, 100 for accredited sportspeople and 80 for physically handicapped people.

International events hosted
The venue will host handball events of the 2017 Summer Deaflympics.

References

Sports venues in Samsun
Indoor arenas in Turkey
Handball venues in Turkey
Çarşamba